Match is a 2014 American drama film written and directed by Stephen Belber, based on his 2004 play of the same name. The film stars Patrick Stewart, Carla Gugino and Matthew Lillard. The film was released on January 14, 2015, by IFC Films.

Plot
The film revolves around Tobi, a middle-aged ex-dancer now working as a ballet instructor at the Juilliard School in New York City. He is asked for an interview by husband and wife Mike and Lisa, who claim Lisa is preparing a dissertation on the dance community of the 1960s. Through the course of the interview, Mike's questions keep getting more and more personal. He finally reveals that he suspects that Tobi is his biological father, as indicated by Mike's mother on her deathbed. When Tobi denies this, Mike forcefully takes a DNA sample from Tobi and rushes to a police lab, where his friend Jim performs a DNA test.

Outraged by Mike's violence, Lisa stays to clean up the mess Mike made. She bonds with Tobi as a person and Tobi reveals that he knows he is Mike's father, but denied it out of shame. He declined to raise the newborn boy, abandoning Mike in favor of his dancing career. The mother then asked that he never talk to them again. He also reveals that he paid a part of Mike's college tuition. Tobi framed the pregnancy and decision to raise the child anyway as a choice the mother made; Mike explained that the mother was not raised to see abortion as a choice.

When Mike returns to take Lisa home, the three have an argument. Tobi tells Mike to treat his wife well. After further intense argument, in which Mike graphically tells Tobi he chose to make his life so that no one loves him, the pair leave. Lisa convinces Tobi to tell Mike the truth and Tobi invites the pair for brunch the next day.

On their way to Tobi's house the next morning, Mike is called by Jim, who tells him that the DNA was not a match.  When Lisa and Mike tell Tobi this, he has an anxiety attack, and politely asks them to let him be alone. As the movie ends, Tobi is heard calling friends to take them up on an offer of a dinner party.

Cast
 Patrick Stewart as Tobi Powell
 Carla Gugino as Lisa 		
 Matthew Lillard as Mike 	
 Maduka Steady as Cabbie
 Jaime Tirelli as Raul
 Rob Yang as Jim

Production
On January 17, 2013, Patrick Stewart, Carla Gugino, and Matthew Lillard joined the cast.

Release
The film premiered at the Tribeca Film Festival on April 18, 2014. The film was released theatrically on January 14, 2015, by IFC Films.

Reception
Match received positive reviews from critics. On Rotten Tomatoes, the film has a rating of 76%, based on 38 reviews, with an average rating of 6.6/10. On Metacritic, the film has a rating of 62 out of 100, based on 17 critics, indicating "generally favorable reviews". In a review on RogerEbert.com Glenn Kenny said, "This is hardly a world-shaker of a movie but it is a well-constructed and thoughtful character study brought to vivid life by its players."

References

External links
 

2014 films
American drama films
2014 drama films
Films set in New York City
Films shot in New York City
2010s English-language films
2010s American films